The 2015 Oregon Ducks football team represented the University of Oregon in the 2015 NCAA Division I FBS football season. The team was led by third-year head coach Mark Helfrich and played their home games at Autzen Stadium for the 49th straight year. They were a member of the Pac-12 Conference in the North Division.

Previous season

Summary

Departing players

NFL draft

Graduation

Before the season

Returning starters
Because of the significant number of injuries to the offensive line in 2014, the Ducks feature a large number of returning offensive linemen who have started in at least one game in a previous season.

Thomas Tyner underwent surgery on his left shoulder on August 7, 2015 and has not been included on the roster for 2015, he is going to miss the 2015 season and has not commented about his future as an Oregon Duck football player. Stetzon Bair, Devon Allen and Darren Carrington are also uncertain about their return to the team in 2015.

Offense

Defense

Special teams

Recruiting

Spring football

Regular season

Schedule

Rankings

Personnel

Oregon head coach Mark Helfrich returns in his third year as Oregon's head coach following season.

The Ducks continue to have the longest tenured staff of any college football program in the United States. Six of the ten assistant positions are staffed by men who have coached at Oregon for over ten years, four of whom have over 25 years of experience as Oregon assistant coaches.

Offensive coordinator Scott Frost was hired by the University of Central Florida Knights football team on December 1, 2015.

Roster

Depth chart

Game summaries

Eastern Washington

In their first game of the 2015 season, the Ducks defeated the Eastern Washington Eagles 61–42 in the teams' first ever matchup in football.

In an interesting twist to an otherwise typical early season matchup against a local FCS power, Eastern Washington's former star quarterback Vernon Adams graduated in the summer of 2015 and transferred to the University of Oregon in order to pursue his graduate studies and utilize his final year of eligibility as the Ducks' starting quarterback.

Michigan State

For their first away game of the season, the Ducks lost to the Michigan State Spartans 31–28 at Spartan Stadium in East Lansing. The game was a rematch from the previous season when the Ducks beat the Spartans at Autzen Stadium in Eugene. The loss returned the all-time record between Oregon and Michigan State to a tie at 3–3.

This game foreshadowed the finger injury that would keep Oregon quarterback Vernon Adams Jr. sidelined or completely ineffective for a month. Adams injured the index finger on his throwing hand during the fourth quarter of the previous week's game against Eastern Washington. For the game against Michigan State, Adams wore gloves on both hands and was seen inspecting his hand while on the sideline. It was conjectured during the game by the announcers that the lack of touch caused by both his broken finger and the glove were to blame for several inaccurate medium to long distance passes thrown by Adams, including missing a wide open Byron Marshall in the end-zone from the Michigan State 33-yard line with 1:24 left in the game that would've put the Ducks up 35–31.

Georgia State

Oregon defeated the Georgia State Panthers 61–28 in its final non-conference home game of the 2015 season. This game was the first meeting between Oregon and Georgia State.

Oregon quarterback Vernon Adams Jr. did not start in this game due to a broken index finger on his throwing hand, Jeff Lockie, the longtime backup to Marcus Mariota, started in his place.

Utah

In their first Pac-12 game of the season, the Ducks lost in historic fashion to the Utah Utes by a score of 62–20. In 2014, Oregon defeated Utah 51–27 at Rice Eccles Stadium in Salt Lake City, UT. Oregon maintained their lead in the all-time series with 20–9; this was the first time that Utah defeated Oregon since joining the Pac-12.

The 42 point loss was the third largest margin of defeat for the Ducks at Autzen Stadium, with the 62 points the most ever allowed by the Ducks in Eugene and the first loss of this magnitude at home since the 1977 season. During the game, Oregon star wide receiver/running back Byron Marshall suffered a lower leg injury and was driven off the field in a cart. Additionally, during the second quarter the Ducks replaced starting quarterback Vernon Adams, Jr. with Jeff Lockie due to Adams' ineffective play caused by a broken index finger on his throwing hand. Because of the broken finger, Adams was unable to complete accurate downfield passes which allowed the Utes to totally focus on defending the run and short passes, effectively neutralizing the Oregon offense. While Lockie was able to generate a spark on his first series, he was unable to generate significant plays.

Colorado

In their first game playing as an unranked team since the 2009 season, the Ducks defeated the Colorado Buffaloes 41–24 at Folsom Field in Boulder. The win extended Oregon's lead in the all-time series to 12–8; they remained undefeated against the Buffaloes in Pac-12 play.

In his place, the Ducks ran a rotation at the quarterback position, playing both long-time backup Jeff Lockie and Taylor Alie, a walk-on who won a 6A Oregon State Championship with Sheldon High School in Eugene.

Washington State

In their first division game of the season, the Ducks lost to the Washington State Cougars 45–38 in Autzen Stadium in double overtime. The loss marked their first season with multiple home losses since the 2007 season. Oregon maintained their lead in the all-time series with 49–37-7.

Washington

Oregon defeated their rival, the Washington Huskies, 26–20 for the twelfth year in a row at Husky Stadium in Seattle. The game featured a healthy Vernon Adams Jr. playing for the Ducks for the first time since their first game of the season; in 2014, Adams almost led his former Eastern Washington team to a major upset of the Huskies, throwing for seven touchdowns and accounting for just under 500 yards from scrimmage. Despite the win, Washington maintained their overall series lead, 58–46–6.

Arizona State

In their sole Thursday night game of the season, the Ducks defeated the Arizona State Sun Devils 61–55 in a thrilling and at times controversial triple overtime game in Sun Devil Stadium. The win extended Oregon's active win streak over the Sun Devils to seven, though they did not play in 2013 or 2014, and their lead in the all-time series to 18–16.

The jerseys worn by the Sun Devils all bore the name Tillman in order to honor Arizona State alumnus Pat Tillman. Tillman played safety for the Sun Devils from 1994 to 1997 and was drafted 226th overall by the Arizona Cardinals in the 1998 NFL Draft. Following the terrorist attacks on September 11, 2001, Tillman declined to sign a new contract with the Cardinals in order to enlist in the Army, eventually becoming a Ranger; he was killed by friendly fire while serving in Afghanistan on April 22, 2004.

California

In their ninth game of the season, the Ducks earned bowl eligibility by defeating the California Golden Bears 44–28 at Autzen Stadium. The Ducks extended their 6-year win streak over California; however, the Golden Bears maintained their all-time series lead, 39–37–2.

Stanford

Oregon defeated the 7th ranked Stanford Cardinal 38–36 on the road in Stanford Stadium. Despite the win, the Cardinal maintained their lead in the all-time series, 46–32–1.

USC

Oregon defeated the USC Trojans 48–28 at home in their 8th win of the year. With the win, Oregon remained in the Pac-12 North championship race until Stanford defeated California later that day to clinch the division title. The Trojans maintained their lead in the overall series, 37–20–2.

Oregon State – 119th Civil War

Oregon defeated their in-state rival, the Oregon State Beavers, 52–42 at Autzen Stadium to earn their eighth straight victory in the 119-year-old series. The Ducks extended their lead in the all-time series 63-46-10.

TCU – 2016 Alamo Bowl

 MVP – Offensive: Bram Kohlhausen (TCU), Defensive: Travin Howard (TCU), Sportsmanship Award: Rodney Hardrick (ORE)

References

Oregon
Oregon Ducks football seasons
Oregon Ducks football